The .400/350 Nitro Express, also known at the .400/350 Nitro Rigby, is a medium bore rifle cartridge developed by John Rigby & Company.

Design
The .400/350 Nitro Express is a rimmed bottlenecked centerfire cartridge originally designed for use in single-shot, bolt action and double rifles.

History
The .400/350 Nitro Express was developed by John Rigby & Co by necking down the .400 Purdey and was introduced in 1899.  That same year Rigby approached the engineers at Mauser to make a special Gewehr 98 bolt action to handle this cartridge, its introduction in 1900 was the birth of the magnum length bolt action, paving the way for such cartridges as the .375 H&H and .416 Rigby.  The magazines of these early magnum length Rigby mauser rifles were slanted to accommodate these rimmed cartridges.

At one time the .400/350 Nitro Express was one of the most popular and widely used medium bore cartridges for hunting in Africa, this popularity was in a large part a result of the excellent bullet design which gave uniform and dependable results.

Use
While the .400/350 Nitro Express was not intended for hunting dangerous game, it was successfully used for hunting all African game.  John "Pondoro" Taylor used a single-shot extensively on lion and other African big game, stating in his African Rifles and Cartridges that this was a favourite rifle of his and the cartridge produced excellent penetration and overall performance.

The later .350 Rigby No 2 uses the same cartridge case but fires a lighter projectile at higher velocities.

See also
Nitro Express
List of rifle cartridges
9mm rifle cartridges

References

External links
 Ammo-One, ".400/350 Rigby", ammo-one.com, retrieved 8 November 2017.
 Cartridgecollector, "400/350 Nitro Express 2 inch", cartridgecollector.net, retrieved 8 November 2017.
 Reloaders Nest, ".400/350 Nitro Express information", reloadersnest.com, retrieved 10 November 2014.
 The Spanish Association of Cartridge Collectors, "400-350 Rigby", municon.org,  1 January 2015.

Pistol and rifle cartridges
British firearm cartridges
John Rigby & Co cartridges